Charles Archibald Brookes Hoadley CBE (Burwood, 1 March 1887 – Footscray, 27 February 1947) was an Australian geologist.

Early life and education 
The son of Abel Hoadley and his wife Susannah Ann née Barrett (he was the tenth of their fourteen children).He attended Toorak Grammar School, and from 1900, Wesley College.

He graduated from the University of Melbourne in 1911 with a degree in mining engineering.

Australasian Antarctic Expedition 

Hoadley was a member of the Australasian Antarctic Expedition led by Sir Douglas Mawson from 1911 to 1914. Hoadley was a member of the Western Base Party. Cape Hoadley was named after him upon discovery by the exploration party.

Educationist 
From 1914 to 1916 he lectured in engineering at Ballarat School of Mines, before becoming the Principal at the Footscray Technical School, a post he held until his death in 1947.

Scouting

In 1909, he founded one of the first Scout Groups in Footscray, Melbourne, Victoria. He was Chief Commissioner of the Scout Association's Victoria Branch from 1927 to 1937, where his major achievement was the creation of Counties to take administrative duties away from Branch Headquarters. He was better known as founder and from 1924 until his death in 1947 Warden of Gilwell Park, Gembrook and a key part of Leader training, being one of the state's two first Deputy Camp Chiefs – authorised to award Scout Leaders with the Wood Badge. In 1952 the new Senior Scout competition hike was named in his honour. The former Hoadley Scout Region in western Melbourne was also named after him. He was awarded the Silver Wolf Award in 1931.

Personal life 

On 21 May 1932, he married Rita Cadle McComb at Holy Trinity, Kew. They had two children. Hoadley died from coronary thrombosis at home, in Footscray on 27 February 1947.

Honours and Awards 

 1913: Caroline Kay Scholarship and Government Research Scholarship in geology
 1915: Polar Medal (Silver, Antarctic, 1912-14)
 1931: Silver Wolf Award
 1936: Commander of the Order of the British Empire (CBE)

References

Further reading 

 Australasian Antarctic Expedition 1911-14 : scientific reports. Series A Vol 1 (Activities of the Western Base Party)
 Hoadley, Jack A., Antarctica to Footscray: Arch Hoadley, a Man of Inspiration and Courage (Melbourne: Sid Harta Publications, 2010).

1887 births
1947 deaths
Australasian Antarctic Expedition
Australian explorers
Commanders of the Order of the British Empire
Explorers from Melbourne
Explorers of Antarctica
Academic staff of the Federation University Australia
Geologists from Melbourne
Recipients of the Polar Medal
Scouting and Guiding in Australia
Academic staff of the Victoria University, Melbourne